The Caspian roach (Rutilus caspicus) is a species of roach fish living in the Caspian Sea. The Caspian roach can be distinguished from other roaches by its laterally compressed body, silvery grey iris, rounded snout and grey pectoral pelvic and anal fins with dark margins. The Caspian roach is semi-anadromous and inhabits mostly shallow coastal waters. It enters Volga, Ural, Emba, Terek and Kura drainages for spawning.

Newer research however suggests that R. caspicus is part of a more widely distributed species or roach, whose range extends to Siberia. The proper name of that species is Rutilus lacustris.

Description
The Caspian roach has a typical size of 30–35 cm (maximum published 45 cm) and a weight of 800 g (maximum published 2000 g). It can be distinguished from its congeners in the Caspian Sea by these characteristics:
 usually 42-44 scales along the lateral line
 dorsal fin usually with 9½ branched rays
 anal fin usually with 10½ branched rays
 rounded snout and subterminal mouth
 anal fins and pectoral pelvic are grey with dark margins

Distribution
The vobla is found in brackish coastal waters of the northern and northwestern Caspian Sea, and enters Volga, Ural, Emba, Terek, and Kura drainages for spawning. There it is locally known as vobla.

As food
Salt-dried vobla is generally eaten without sauces or side dishes. Many people like to eat their vobla with a glass of beer, which lessens the salty taste of the fish.

Vobla could be considered a raw fish, but, in fact, it is neither raw nor cooked, but rather salt-cured. It is soaked in brine for some days and then is thoroughly air-dried for another two, which in the end denatures the protein,  as a form of chemical "cooking".

References

External links

Rutilus rutilus caspicus (Jakowlew, 1870) www.caspianenvironment.org

See also

 List of dried foods

Rutilus
Fish of the Caspian Sea
Taxa named by Vasily Evgrafovich Yakovlev